Exell is a surname. Notable people with the surname include:

 Arthur Wallis Exell (1901–1993), British botanist and cryptographer
 Gavin Exell (born 1962), Australian rules footballer

See also
Excell